Right Time or The Right Time may refer to:

Songs
 "Night Time Is the Right Time" (or "The Right Time"), rhythm and blues standard first recorded in 1957
 "The Right Time" (Hoodoo Gurus song), 1993 single by Australian rock group Hoodoo Gurus
 "Right Time" (Mango Groove song), 1995 song by South African band Mango Groove
 "The Right Time" (The Corrs song), 1996 song by Irish band The Corrs
 "The Right Time" (Ultra song), 1998 song by British pop group Ultra
 "Right Time", 2020 song by Australian musician Hayden James and Swedish pop duo Icona Pop
 "Right Time", 2014 song by Nikki Lane from her album All or Nothin'

Albums
Right Time, 1976 album by Jamaican reggae band Mighty Diamonds
The Right Time (Etta James album), 1992 album by American R&B singer Etta James
The Right Time (Bosson album), 1998 album by Swedish group Bosson

Other
Tom Jones: The Right Time, 1992 television series hosted by Welsh singer Tom Jones

See also
"This Is the Right Time", 1989 song by British singer Lisa Stansfield